Richard Fort (29 Jul 1856 – 30 Jun 1918) was an English Liberal politician who sat in the House of Commons from 1880 to 1885.

Fort was the son of Richard Fort MP for Clitheroe and his wife Margaret Ellen Smith, daughter of Major-General John N Smith HEICS. He was educated at Eton College and Brasenose College, Oxford. He joined the 11th Hussars in 1878 and became a lieutenant in 1880. He was a J.P. for Lancashire.

Fort was elected as Member of Parliament for Clitheroe at the 1880 general election, a seat previously held by his father. He stood down at the 1885 general election, and did not stand for Parliament again.

His nephew, also called Richard Fort, was MP for Clitheroe from 1950 to 1959.

References

External links 

1856 births
1918 deaths
Liberal Party (UK) MPs for English constituencies
UK MPs 1880–1885
11th Hussars officers
People educated at Eton College
Alumni of Brasenose College, Oxford